The Sorgar are a Manihar Muslim community found in the state of Rajasthan in India. Many members of Sorgar community have migrated to Pakistan after independence have settled in Karachi, Sindh.

History and origin
The Sorgar claim descent from Pashtuns, who were brought to Rajasthan to manufacture gunpowder. The word Sorgar in Rajasthani means "a manufacturer of gunpowder".  According to their traditions, the ancestors of the community were Pathan guards employed by a Rajput Rajah, who were involved in an altercation, which led to death. They were pardoned by the Rajah, on the pre-condition that they manufacture gunpowder.

Present circumstances
They are found mainly in the districts of Chitorgarh, Jaipur, Jodhpur and Udaipur. The Sorgar speak Mewari within the community, and Urdu with outsiders. They are divided into four clans, Tanwar, Bhati, Chauhan and Afghan. These clans are equal in status, and intermarry with each other. The community is endogamous, but do not marry with the Pathan of Rajasthan.
The Sorgar are a community of small peasants. There traditional occupation of manufacturing gunpowder has ceased, although many still supplement their income by repairing guns. They are Sunni Muslims, and have customs similar to other Rajasthan Muslim communities.

See also

 Pashtun diaspora
 Manihar
 Atishbaz
 Mughal

References

Social groups of Rajasthan
Muslim communities of India
Pashtun tribes
Social groups of Pakistan
Muslim communities of Rajasthan
Pashtun diaspora in India